Three ships of the Japanese Navy have been named Chihaya:

  was a cruiser launched in 1900 and struck in 1929
  a submarine rescue vessel

Japanese Navy ship names
Imperial Japanese Navy ship names